Jose Villa Panganiban (12 June 1903 – 13 October 1972 ) was a lexicographer, professor, linguist, essayist, poet, playwright, author, and lyricist. Panganiban was a prolific writer, with over 1,000 works to his name (textbooks, dictionaries, books, poems, short stories, articles, plays, etc.). Among his textbooks were Pagsusuring Pambalarila; Panitikan ng Pilipinas; Comparative Semantics of Synonyms and Homonyms in the Philippine Language, and publications such as Diksyunaryong Pilipino-Ingles; Concise English-Pilipino Dictionary; Thought, Language, Feelings;  Isip, Wika, Damdamin; a collection of poetry, Mga Butil na Perlas; 101 Tanong at Sagot na Pangwika; 90 Painless Lessons in Pilipino; Tanaga, Haiku, Pantun and many more.  Thirty-two years of research produced two Thesaurus-Dictionaries:  Diksyunaryo-Tesaurong Pilipino-Ingles and the Thesaurus-Dictionary English-Pilipino, considered to be his magnum opus.
After his death, the street where he used to live in was named after him. JV Panganiban street can be found in the city of San Juan in Barangay Onse, Philippines.

Early life

In 1903, Geminiano Panganiban, a lawyer, pharmacist and a non-combatant lieutenant in the Philippine Revolutionary Army, had to surrender to the U.S. Expeditionary Forces in Northern Luzon because his wife, Policarpia Villa, from Caloocan Rizal, a descendant of Emilio Jacinto of the revolution, was pregnant.  The couple was placed in a concentration camp in what is now Bautista, Pangasinan. There, Jose Villa Panganiban was born on June 12, 1903, five years to the day after Gen. Aguinaldo proclaimed Philippine independence from Spain in 1898.  In 1911, JVP's mother died and in 1917, father and son returned to Geminiano's hometown in Tanauan, Batangas where the father remarried Fidela Collantes of the prominent Collantes clan.

Marriage

JVP married his childhood sweetheart, Consuelo Torres from Tanauan, Batangas in 1930.  “Cons”, as he fondly called her, co-authored two dictionaries with her husband.  Their 42 years of marriage produced 5 children:  Jose Jr. (+), Rosamyrna (Carandang), Virgilio (+), Consuelina (Dominguez) and Ligaya (Gamboa).

Director of the Institute of National Language from the time of Pres. Magsaysay up to Pres. Marcos, Panganiban was also a professor at the University of Santo Tomas, Manuel L. Quezon University & the Philippine Normal College.  Among others, he founded the UST periodical, Varsitarian; was president of the Akademya ng Wikang Pilipino of the UNESCO; member of the Philippine-Japanese Trade Negotiations of 1960 and held many key positions in government and civic organizations.  JVP received numerous National and International awards and citations for literature, journalism, etc., the earliest international award being the  Richard Reid  Award for  Journalism while on post graduate scholarship at the Notre Dame University in South Bend, Indiana in 1940.  In 1999, a Jose Villa Panganiban Varsitarian Professorial Chair was established by the University of Santo Tomas.

Love of Pilipino

In expressing his love for a national language, both orally and in writing, JVP became a controversial advocate of Pilipino as the “wikang pambansa”.  His detractors called him “Diktador ng Wika”, “High Priest of National Language”, “Emperador ng Wika”, “Czar ng Purismo” and “Frankenstein ng Purismo”. On the other hand, his allies called him “Bayani ng Wikang Pambansa”. JVP was neither a dictator nor a purist. He wrote in 1970:

“Multilingualism would be a solution to our linguistic problems.  It would erase colonialism.. it would eliminate regionalism.. it would create nationalism.  In the mutual contact of languages, foreign and local, the most useful form of national language will surface and will become the real PILIPINO.”

Unfortunately, it was not until months after his death that the 1973 Constitution established Pilipino as one of the two official languages of the Philippines – the other being English. In 1987, the Constitution stipulated that the National Assembly was to take steps toward the formation of a genuine national language to be called Filipino, which will incorporate elements from the various Philippine languages.

References

The Varsitarian
https://openlibrary.org/authors/OL15200A/Jose%CC%81_Villa_Panganiban
https://web.archive.org/web/20100704164443/http://www.varsitarian.net/jvp_professorial_chair/jvp_professorial_chair

Linguists from the Philippines
Magazine founders
Lexicographers
Filipino language
1972 deaths
1903 births
People from Tanauan, Batangas
People from Pangasinan
Manuel L. Quezon University
20th-century linguists
20th-century lexicographers